The National Foundation for Debt Management (NFDM), is a United States credit counseling agency.  The organization is incorporated, but is organized as a non-profit.  This group focuses on consumer education on debt practices.  They also focus on distributing personal finance information to the public.

References 

Credit